John L. Coffey (1927 - 19 July 2014) was an American television director.

Positions held
All My Children (Director: 1986–1993)
Somerset (Director: 1974–1976)

Awards and nominations
Coffey received 12 Daytime Emmy Award nominations and an Emmy nod. His first DE nomination was shared with Del Hughes and Henry Kaplan.

References

External links
 Coffey-IMDB 

American television directors
1927 births
2014 deaths